Brad Gilbert was the defending champion.

Gilbert successfully defended his title, beating Aaron Krickstein in the final, 7–5, 6–2.

Seeds

  Brad Gilbert (champion)
  Aaron Krickstein (final)
  Peter Lundgren (second round)
  Christo Steyn (semifinals)
  Eddie Edwards (first round)
  Amos Mansdorf (semifinals)
  Mark Dickson (first round)
  Danie Visser (first round)

Draw

Finals

Top half

Bottom half

References

 Main Draw

Tel Aviv Open
1986 Grand Prix (tennis)